is a city located in Ibaraki Prefecture, Japan. , the city had an estimated population of 39,127 in 14,733 households and a population density of 191 persons per km². The percentage of the population aged over 65 was 37.1%.

Geography
Inashiki is located in southern Ibaraki Prefecture, bordered by Lake Kasumigaura to the north and Chiba Prefecture to the south. It is approximately 70 kilometers northeast of Tokyo.

Rivers
Crossed by Ono River (小野川) and Shintone River (新利根川), which flow into the Kasumigaura. Bordead by the Hachiku River (破竹川) on the southwest, Tone River (利根川) on the southeast, and Yokotone River (横利根川) on the east. Hachiku pours its waters into the Shintone River, Yokotone into the Tone River, and the Tone River at the end of its course empties into the Ocean Pacific.

Surrounding municipalities
Ibaraki Prefecture
 Itako
 Ryūgasaki
 Ami
Miho
 Kawachi
Chiba Prefecture
Katori
Kōzaki

Climate
Inashiki has a Humid continental climate (Köppen Cfa) characterized by warm summers and cool winters with light snowfall.  The average annual temperature in Inashiki is 14.3 °C. The average annual rainfall is 1360 mm with September as the wettest month. The temperatures are highest on average in August, at around 26.0 °C, and lowest in January, at around 3.6 °C.

Demographics
Per Japanese census data, the population of Inashiki peaked around the year 2000 and has declined since.

History
The city of Inashiki was established on March 22, 2005, from the merger of the towns of Azuma, Edosaki and Shintone, and the village of Sakuragawa (all from Inashiki District).

Government
Inashiki has a mayor-council form of government with a directly elected mayor and a unicameral city council of 20 members. Inashiki, together with neighboring Kawachi, contributes one member to the Ibaraki Prefectural Assembly. In terms of national politics, the city is part of Ibaraki 3rd district of the lower house of the Diet of Japan.

Economy
The economy of Inashiki is primarily agricultural, with rice, broccoli, lotus root, kabocha pumpkins, fig as major cash crops.

Fishery in the Lake Kasumigaura and rivers.

Factories, machining sector and commercial facilities.

Education
Inashiki has ten public elementary schools and four public middle schools operated by the city government, and one public high school operated by the Ibaraki Prefectural Board of Education.

Transportation

Railway
Inashiki does not have any passenger railway services. If you require use the railway, use the Joban Line from Tsuchiura Station, Hitachino-Ushiku Station, Arakawaoki Station, etc. Also, you can use the Jōsō Line through the Ryūgasaki Line from Ryūgasaki Station.

Airport
Inashiki does not have airport services. Narita International Airport is adjacent and located in Narita City of the Chiba Prefecture.

Highway
  – Edosaki Parking Area, Inashiki Interchange, Inashiki-Higashi Interchange
 
 
 
  Prefectural roads, such as Ibaraki Prefectural Routes 2, 5, 11, 25 and 49.

Local attractions
Ancient Ōsugi shrine Festival.
Edosaki Gion Festival.
Tulip Festival in Wada Park of Ukishima, on the shores of Lake Kasumigaura.

Sister cities
 Salmon Arm, British Columbia, Canada  since February 1990

Notable people from Inashiki 
 Inazuma Raigorō, sumo wrestler
Tatsuya Kawajiri, mixed martial arts
Shirō Takasu, admiral in the Imperial Japanese Navy

References

External links

Official Website 

Cities in Ibaraki Prefecture
Populated places established in 2005
2005 establishments in Japan
Inashiki